Donna Reardon is a Canadian politician, who currently serves as the mayor of Saint John, New Brunswick.

She was first elected as a city councillor in May 2012, and was re-elected in 2016. She was elected the 79th Mayor on May 25, 2021 in the 2021 New Brunswick municipal elections. She was officially sworn in office on June 7, 2021 in the Marco Polo Room of the Saint John Trade and Convention Centre. She is the third female Mayor of the city.

She is a trained dietician and has worked as an administrator at her husband's medical practice.

Electoral record

2021 Municipal General Election

2016 Municipal General Election

2012 Municipal General Election

References

Mayors of Saint John, New Brunswick
Living people
Year of birth missing (living people)
Women mayors of places in New Brunswick